Adrastus was a legendary king of Argos.

Adrastus means inescapable. It may also refer to:

Adrastus (mythology), various figures in Greek mythology
Adrastus (son of Gordias), who features in Herodotus's story of King Croesus of Lydia
Adrastus of Aphrodisias (fl. 2nd century CE), Peripatetic philosopher
Adrantus (also known as Adrastus or Ardrantus, fl. 2nd or 3rd century CE), Greek writer
Adrastus of Cyzicus, Ancient Roman astronomer
Adrastus (beetle), a genus of Elateridae (click beetles)
 Adrastus, an impact crater on the moon Dione

See also
Adrastea (disambiguation)
Adrasteia